2181 Fogelin is an Eunomia asteroid from the central regions of the asteroid belt, approximately  in diameter. It was discovered on 28 December 1942, by Germany astronomer Karl Reinmuth at the Heidelberg Observatory in southwest Germany. In 1980, it was named for Eric S. Fogelin an assistant at the Minor Planet Center. The likely elongated S-type asteroid has a rotation period of 14.07 hours.

Orbit and classification 

Fogelin is a member of the Eunomia family, a prominent family of stony asteroid and the largest one in the intermediate main belt with more than 5,000 known members. It orbits the Sun in the central main-belt at a distance of 2.3–2.9 AU once every 4 years and 2 months (1,523 days; semi-major axis of 2.59 AU). Its orbit has an eccentricity of 0.12 and an inclination of 13° with respect to the ecliptic. The body's observation arc begins at Heidelberg with its official discovery observation in December 1942.

Naming 

This minor planet was named by Brian Marsden and Conrad Bardwell of the Minor Planet Center, after their assistant, Eric S. Fogelin. During 1979–1980, he was preparing the center's computerized data and helped publishing the Minor Planet Circulars. The official naming citation was published by the Minor Planet Center on 1 August 1980.

Physical characteristics 

Fogelin is an assumed S-type asteroid, in line with the overall spectral type seen among Eunomian asteroids. Near-IR spectroscopy at the NASA Infrared Telescope Facility with the SpeX instrument showed that the asteroid contains mafic minerals, which are rich in magnesium and iron.

Rotation period 

In March 2010, a rotational lightcurve of Fogelin was obtained from photometric observations by Richard Durkee at the Shed of Science Observatory  in the United States. Lightcurve analysis gave a well-defined rotation period of 14.07 hours with a brightness amplitude of 0.57 magnitude, indicative of an elongated shape.

Diameter and albedo 

According to the surveys carried out by the Japanese Akari satellite and the NEOWISE mission of NASA's Wide-field Infrared Survey Explorer, Fogelin measures between 10.067 and 11.29 kilometers in diameter and its surface has an albedo between 0.200 and 0.252. The Collaborative Asteroid Lightcurve Link assumes an albedo of 0.21 – derived from 15 Eunomia, the family's parent body and namesake – and calculates a diameter of 11.55 kilometers based on an absolute magnitude of 12.0.

References

External links 
 Lightcurve Database Query (LCDB), at www.minorplanet.info
 Dictionary of Minor Planet Names, Google books
 Asteroids and comets rotation curves, CdR – Geneva Observatory, Raoul Behrend
 Discovery Circumstances: Numbered Minor Planets (1)-(5000) – Minor Planet Center
 
 

002181
Discoveries by Karl Wilhelm Reinmuth
Named minor planets
19421228